The 2022 FIBA U18 African Championship was an international under-18 basketball competition that was held in Antananarivo, Madagascar from August 4 to 14.

The tournament, which is also the 21st edition of the biennial competition, will qualify the top two teams to represent FIBA Africa in the 2023 FIBA Under-19 Basketball World Cup in Hungary. This is the second time Madagascar has hosted the tournament since 2014.

Qualification

Qualified teams

Includes current world ranking prior to the start of the tournament (in parenthesis).

 Host Nation (1)
  (NR)
 Zone I
  (46)
 Zone II
  (42)
  (15)
  (18)
 Zone III
  (NR)
 Zone V
  (51)
  (25)
 Zone VI
  (47)

Preliminary round
The draw took place and the final rosters were confirmed on 3 August 2022, a day before the start of the tournament. 

Tanzania was supposed to be part of Group A, however they were replaced by Nigeria. Unfortunately, Nigeria also backed out, leaving Group A with only 4 teams.

All times are local (UTC+3).

Group A

Group B

Knockout stage

Bracket

Quarterfinals

{{Basketballbox|date=11 August 2022|time=15:00|place=Palais des Sports Mahamasina, Antananarivo
|teamA=  |scoreA= 50
|teamB=  |scoreB= 58
|Q1= 20–21 |Q2= 10–7 |Q3= 11–13 |Q4= 9–17
|report=Boxscore
|points1= Bouhmama 15
|rebounds1= Bouhmama 9
|assist1= Ben Salah 4
|points2= Zahran 13
|rebounds2= Elshakery 10
|assist2= Elshakery 3
|referee= Erick Omondi Otieno (KEN), Nilton Macamo (MOZ), Peter Ontita (KEN)
}}

5–8th place classification

Semifinals

Seventh place game

Fifth place game

Third place game

Final

Final standings

 Awards 

All-Tournament Team
 C  Malick Diallo
 F  Fahmi Fahmi 
 F  Belal Elshakery
 G  Mathias M'Madi (MVP)'''
 G  Ibrahima Diallo

References

Basketball
International basketball competitions hosted by Madagascar
Bask
FIBA Under-18 African Championship